The Hollywood Turf Cup is a Grade II American Thoroughbred horse race for three-years-old or older over a distance of one and one-half miles (12 furlongs) on the turf track scheduled annually in late November at Del Mar Racetrack in Del Mar, California. The event currently carries a purse of $250,000.

History

The inaugural running of the event was on 6 December 1981 under Weight-for-Age conditions with an impressive purse of US500,000 added. The event as planned by West Coast racing administration attracted some fine horses including Europeans who had come to the US to run in the Washington, D.C. International. The event was won by the Irish-bred Providential who raced in the US as Providential II and had previously won the Washington, D.C. International in a star studded field which included John Henry who was the leading stakes winner in the US at the time and started as the 2/5 odds-on favorite.

The race was run in two divisions in 1982 at a shorter distance of  miles. 

In 1983 the American Graded Stakes Committee classified the event with the highest status of Grade I. John Henry returned to make amends in 1983 to win and become the first racehorse to surpass $4 million in career earnings. In 1985 the distance of the event was returned to its initial distance of  miles.
 
In 1991 the winner Miss Alleged was the only filly to ever win this race.

Horses who previously ran in the Breeders' Cup Turf would sometimes run in the Turf Cup since it is the last major turf race of the year. 

The race was not run in 2005 due to problems with Hollywood Park's grass course not being ready after the turf course was reseeded. The event was not held in 2009 as several high profile events were cancelled in an effort to sustain overnight purses with a shortened meeting of only 27 days.

The event was downgraded in 2012 to Grade II. With the closure of Hollywood Park Racetrack in 2013 the event was moved to Del Mar Racetrack.

Records
Speed record:
 miles:  2:24.61 – Boboman  (2006)
 miles:  2:13.40 – The Hague  (1982)

Margins:
6 lengths – Fraise (1993)

Most wins:
 2 – Alphabatim (1984, 1986)
 2 – Lazy Lode (1998, 1999)

Most wins by an owner:
 3 – Juddmonte Farms (Prince Khalid Abdullah) (1984, 1986, 2008)

Most wins by a jockey:
 8 – Chris McCarron (1983, 1984, 1989, 1991, 1992, 1993, 1996, 2000)

Most wins by a trainer:
 4 – Robert J. Frankel (1997, 2001, 2003, 2008)

Winners
 

Legend:

 

Notes:

§ Ran as an entry

† In 1992, Fraise finished first but officials disqualified him and he was set back to second place for bumping Bien Bien in the stretch.

‡ In 2003, Epicentre won the race but was disqualied for interference in the stretch and set back to third.

See also
List of American and Canadian Graded races

External links
 2021 Del Mar Media Guide

References

Horse races in California
Del Mar Racetrack
Graded stakes races in the United States
Grade 2 stakes races in the United States
Open middle distance horse races
Recurring sporting events established in 1981
1981 establishments in California